Venezuela is a 33-RPM LP album by Venezuelan composer/arranger/conductor Aldemaro Romero, released in 1958, under contract with RCA Victor.

This album was part of a very successful series of records, featuring Venezuelan folk pieces, starting in 1955 with Dinner in Caracas.

Track listing

1958 albums
Aldemaro Romero albums
RCA Records albums